The Croatian 1-A Volleyball League is the highest level of volleyball competition in Croatia. It is organized by the Croatian Volleyball Federation. It was founded in 1992.

Croatian Volleyball League and Cup winners - Men

Croatian Volleyball League and Cup winners - Women

References

External links 
Croatian Volleyball Federation 
Croatian Volleyball Portal 
Croatian 1-A Volleyball League 
  Croatian League. women.volleybox.net  

1A Volleyball League
Croatia
Sports leagues established in 1992
Professional sports leagues in Croatia